Peristoma is a genus of gastropods belonging to the family Enidae.

The species of this genus are found in Black Sea.

Species:

Peristoma boettgeri 
Peristoma lanceum 
Peristoma merduenianum 
Peristoma rupestre

References

Enidae